Bryan Danilo Taiva Lobos (born 17 June 1995) is a Chilean footballer who currently plays for Deportes Melipilla as a striker.

Career
As a youth player, Taiva was with Colo-Colo and Universidad de Chile. After, he played for San Marcos de Arica (loan), San Luis de Quillota (loan), Deportes Temuco and Deportes Santa Cruz.

In 2023, he joined Deportes Melipilla in the Segunda División Profesional.

References

External links
 

Living people
1995 births
Footballers from Santiago
Chilean footballers
Universidad de Chile footballers
San Marcos de Arica footballers
San Luis de Quillota footballers
Deportes Temuco footballers
Deportes Santa Cruz footballers
Deportes Melipilla footballers
Chilean Primera División players
Primera B de Chile players
Segunda División Profesional de Chile players
Association football forwards